= Atlanta Falcons stadium =

Atlanta Falcons stadium may refer to:

- Atlanta–Fulton County Stadium
- Georgia Dome
- Mercedes-Benz Stadium

== See also ==
- Category:Atlanta Falcons stadiums
